Marinus Maryanto Wanewar (born 24 February 1997 in Sarmi) is an Indonesian professional footballer who plays as a striker for Liga 2 club Persela Lamongan.

Club career

Persipura Jayapura
Marinus made his debut with Persipura Jayapura, when Persipura Jayapura played against Bhayangkara. He scored his first goal in the 52nd minute and was shown a second yellow for his excessive celebration. Marinus claimed to be too excited after scoring the goal after receiving a nice pass from his boyhood idol Boaz Solossa.
He said, "when I did the celebration, I did not remember if I already had a yellow card, I never expected to get a red card. I'm too happy to receive the ball from Boaz to score the goal".

Bhayangkara (loan)
He was signed for Bhayangkara to play in the Liga 1 in the 2018 season, on loan from Persipura Jayapura. Wanewar made his debut on 14 April 2018 in a match against Perseru Serui. On 27 May 2018, Wanewar scored his first goal for Bhayangkara against Borneo in the 63rd minute at the PTIK Stadium, Jakarta. He made 18 league appearances and scored 3 goals for Bhayangkara.

Muba Babel United
In 2021, Marinus signed a contract with Indonesian Liga 2 club Muba Babel United.

Persis Solo
In 2021, Marinus Wanewar signed a contract with Indonesian Liga 2 club Persis Solo. He made his league debut on 9 November 2021 in a match against Persijap Jepara at the Manahan Stadium, Surakarta.

PSM Makassar
After helping Persis win the 2021 Liga 2 title and earn promotion to the top flight, Wanewar played for Liga 1 club PSM Makassar on loan until the end of the 2021-22 season.

International career
He made his international debut for senior team on 8 June 2017, against Cambodia.

Career statistics

Club

International

International goals
International under-23 goals

Honours

International 
Indonesia U-23
 AFF U-22 Youth Championship: 2019
 Southeast Asian Games  Bronze medal: 2017

Club 
Persipura Jayapura
 Indonesia Soccer Championship A: 2016
Persis Solo
 Liga 2: 2021

Individual
 AFF U-22 Youth Championship Top Goalscorer: 2019 (Shared)

References

External links
 

1997 births
Living people
Indonesian footballers
People from Sarmi Regency
Persipura Jayapura players
Liga 1 (Indonesia) players
Indonesia youth international footballers
Association football forwards
Southeast Asian Games bronze medalists for Indonesia
Southeast Asian Games medalists in football
Competitors at the 2017 Southeast Asian Games
Indonesia international footballers
Sportspeople from Papua